Exilioidea is a genus of sea snails, marine gastropod mollusks in the family Ptychatractidae.

Species
Species within the genus Exilioidea include:
 Exilioidea atlantica Bouchet & Warén, 1988
 Exilioidea costulata Bouchet et Warén, 1988
 Exilioidea indica Bouchet et Warén, 1988
 Exilioidea kelseyi (Dall, 1908)
 Exilioidea rectirostris (Carpenter, 1864)
 Exilioidea rufocaudata (Dall, 1896)

References

 Bouchet P. & Warén A. (1988). Transfer of Exilioidea Grant & Gale, 1931 to Turbinellidae, with descriptions of three new species (Neogastropoda). Venus. 47(3): 172-184
 McLean J.H. (1996). The Prosobranchia. In: Taxonomic Atlas of the Benthic Fauna of the Santa Maria Basin and Western Santa Barbara Channel. The Mollusca Part 2 – The Gastropoda. Santa Barbara Museum of Natural History. volume 9: 1-160

External links
 Grant U.S. & Gale H.R. (1931). Catalogue of the marine Pliocene and Pleistocene Mollusca of California and adjacent region. Memoirs of the San Diego Society of Natural History. 1: 1036 pp., 32 pl

Ptychatractidae